The Daytime Emmy Award for Outstanding Culinary Program has been awarded every year by the Academy of Television Arts & Sciences since 2010.

Winners and nominees

2010s

2020s
2020:
Giada Entertains (Food Network)
Barefoot Contessa: Cook Like a Pro (Food Network)
Milkstreet (PBS)
30 Minute Meals (Food Network)Valerie's Home Cooking (Food Network)

2021:
Barefoot Contessa: Cook Like a Pro (Food Network)Lidia's Kitchen (PBS)Lucky Chow (PBS)Mise en Place (Eater)Pati's Mexican Table (PBS)tasteMAKERS (PBS)Trisha's Southern Kitchen (Food Network)

Multiple nominations
4 nominations
 America's Test Kitchen Giada at Home Guy's Big Bite3 nominations
 Barefoot Contessa Bobby Flay's Barbecue Addiction Cook's Country Lidia's Kitchen The Mind of a Chef2 nominations
  Giada Entertains My Grandmother's Ravioli Trisha's Southern Kitchen Valerie's Home CookingPrograms with multiple awards
3 awards
 Barefoot Contessa''

Channels with multiple wins and nominations

Wins
The Food Network-9
PBS-3

Nominations (3 or more)
The Food Network-28
PBS-21

References

Daytime Emmy Awards
Awards established in 2010